Ceraclea is a genus of long-horned caddisflies in the family Leptoceridae. There are more than 140 described species in Ceraclea.
 Though this genus lacks the long antennae of other Leptoceridae, it can be easily identified by the distinctive wart pattern on its thorax: two curving bars running from the pronotum to the scutellum.

See also
 List of Ceraclea species

References

Further reading

External links

 

Trichoptera genera
Articles created by Qbugbot
Integripalpia